Roy Charles Waller (born January 8, 1960) is an American serial rapist. He was arrested in September 2018 as a suspect in a series of more than ten rapes and kidnappings committed between 1991 and 2006 in six Northern California counties (the NorCal Rapist). DNA evidence from crime scenes were matched on the online DNA-matching service, GEDmatch, to a relative of Waller, and he was identified through genetics-based genealogy.

Police constructed a family tree and, using the known elements of the rapist, narrowed the suspects down to Waller. After the GEDmatch confirmation, they took about a week to identify and arrest the suspect. He was charged with a total of dozens of counts of rape, which took place in five different counties, including Sonoma, Solano, Contra Costa, Yolo and Butte. At the time of his arrest he was living in Benicia, was married, and was employed as a safety specialist at the University of California  Berkeley. He had worked there for 26 years. He was convicted of 46 counts in November 2020.

The same genetic genealogy technique had been used in the identification and arrest of the suspect known as the Golden State Killer.

Norcal Rapist crime details
According to a detective who first worked on the case, in the attacks for which Waller is charged, the rapist had a pattern of behavior. He would enter victims' houses, usually late at night. Sometimes the victim would be asleep. Sometimes they would be going about evening activities. He would overcome and bind the women, then repeatedly sexually assault them and ransack the home. Sometimes he would abduct the victim, taking her to an ATM, and forcing the victim to give him the password, and he would steal money from the account. At "other times, he would steal personal items from their homes," Detective Avis Beery said. He frequently targeted women of Asian descent in their 20s.

Legal proceedings
Waller was originally charged with 12 counts of forcible sexual assault. In January 2019, he was charged with an additional 28 counts. He was later charged with a total of 46 felony counts. His trial date was set for May 27, 2020 but was delayed multiple times. His trial began on October 19, and on November 18, Waller was convicted of 46 counts of rape, sodomy and kidnapping involving nine victims. On December 18, Waller was sentenced to 897 years to life in prison.

References 

1960 births
Living people
20th-century American criminals
21st-century American criminals
American kidnappers
American rapists
American male criminals
American people convicted of kidnapping
American people convicted of rape
American people convicted of sodomy
American prisoners sentenced to life imprisonment
Criminals of the San Francisco Bay Area
Prisoners sentenced to life imprisonment by California
Rapes in the United States
University of California, Berkeley people
Violence against women in the United States